The 1997–98 Detroit Titans men's basketball team represented the University of Detroit Mercy in the 1997–98 NCAA Division I men's basketball season. Led by coach Perry Watson, the Titans played their home games at Calihan Hall as members of the Midwestern Collegiate Conference. They finished the season 25–6 overall, 12–2 in MCC play to win the regular season league title.

Playing in the MCC tournament as the No. 1 seed, they defeated UW-Milwaukee in the quarterfinals before losing to Green Bay in the semifinals. Despite the early exit, Detroit received an at-large bid to the NCAA tournament as No. 10 seed in the Midwest region. The Titans beat No. 7 seed  in the opening round before losing to No. 2 seed Purdue in the second round.

This 1997–98 team, which tied the school record with 25 wins and reached the NCAA Tournament for the first time since 1979, was honored 20 years later.

Roster

Schedule and results

|-
!colspan=9 style=| Regular season

|-
!colspan=9 style=| NCAA Tournament

References

Detroit Titans
Detroit Mercy Titans men's basketball seasons
Detroit
Detroit Titans men's b
Detroit Titans men's b